The Horse Rangers Association is a registered charity which teaches horsemanship and management of horses so that youngsters of all backgrounds and abilities, from the age of 8 years, can benefit in their own personal development. It is not a riding school.

The Association is based at The Royal Mews, Hampton Court in the London Borough of Richmond upon Thames. A member group of the Riding for the Disabled Association (RDA), it is registered with the British Horse Society (BHS).

History

The Horse Rangers Association was founded in Shepperton, Surrey in 1954 by Raymond Gordon. The charity relocated to the Royal Mews, Hampton Court during the 1960s.  Raymond Gordon’s vision was to enable young people, who would not otherwise have the opportunity, to manage horses and ride; from early in the charity’s existence this included young people with special needs.

Activities
More than 400 children and young people attend classes at the Association each week. The Association's special needs classes operate at its indoor school, located at the Stockyard, Bushy Park.

Organisation
The board of trustees is chaired by Jeremy Schomberg.

References

1954 establishments in the United Kingdom
Bushy Park
Charities based in London
Children's charities based in the United Kingdom
Equestrian organizations
Experiential learning
Hampton, London
Non-profit organisations based in the United Kingdom
Youth organisations based in London
Organisations based in the London Borough of Richmond upon Thames
Organizations established in 1954
Outdoor education organizations